Kamais may refer to:

Peter Kamais (born 1976), Kenyan long-distance runner
Kamais, a Himalayan people

Kenyan names